Michael Douglas Garman (born September 16, 1949) is an American former professional baseball player. A relief pitcher, he played for five different teams in Major League Baseball (MLB) between 1969 and 1978. He was a first-round draft selection of the Boston Red Sox in the 1967 MLB draft.

Career

Boston Red Sox
Born and raised in Caldwell, Idaho, Garman was the third overall selection in the 1967 MLB Draft, chosen by the Boston Red Sox. His brother, Stephen, spent two seasons in the San Francisco Giants organization.

Garman signed with the Red Sox upon graduation at age 17 from Caldwell High School, and was assigned to the Greenville Red Sox of the Western Carolinas League. He lost the only game he appeared in for Greenville, giving up three hits and two walks in the only inning he pitched. He was then reassigned to the Winston-Salem Red Sox, where he went 1–3 with a 6.75 earned run average.

He had no decisions in twelve appearances as manager Eddie Kasko used him mostly in mop up roles.

St. Louis Cardinals
Following his only full season with the BoSox, he was traded with John Curtis and Lynn McGlothen to the St. Louis Cardinals for Reggie Cleveland, Terry Hughes and Diego Segui.

It was with the Cardinals where Garman enjoyed his best seasons. He also collected ten saves. He was traded to the Chicago Cubs with a player to be named later for Don Kessinger. In his only season in Chicago, Garman made two emergency starts in the second games of double headers, losing both.

Los Angeles Dodgers
On January 11, the Cubs sent Garman and Rick Monday to the Los Angeles Dodgers for Bill Buckner, Ivan De Jesus and Jeff Albert. While with the Dodgers, he reached the post season for the only time in his career, appearing in two games of the 1977 National League Championship Series and two games in the 1977 World Series without giving up an earned run.

Garman was later traded in May 1978 to the Montreal Expos for Gerry Hannahs and Larry Landreth. After one season with the Expos, he failed to make the team in 1979 spring training after which he signed a minor league deal with the Pittsburgh Pirates, and also spent part of that season with the Cleveland Indians' triple A affiliate before retiring.

References

External links
, or Baseball Almanac

1949 births
Living people
American expatriate baseball players in Canada
Baseball players from Idaho
Boston Red Sox players
Chicago Cubs players
Greenville Red Sox players
Los Angeles Dodgers players
Louisville Colonels (minor league) players
Major League Baseball pitchers
Montreal Expos players
People from Caldwell, Idaho
Portland Beavers players
St. Louis Cardinals players
Tacoma Tugs players
Winston-Salem Red Sox players